12 Dates of Christmas is a television film starring Amy Smart and Mark-Paul Gosselaar. It premiered on ABC Family on December 11, 2011 in their 25 Days of Christmas programming block. It is directed by James Hayman. The movie depicts Smart as Kate, a woman insensitive to the feelings of others and who wants to return to a past relationship, and Gosselaar as Miles, a widower who hopes to find a new romantic partner. After Kate blows off her blind date with Miles on Christmas Eve, she discovers she is stuck in a time-loop, giving her 12 chances to mature, improve her relationships with others, and find romance with Miles.

Plot
Kate Stanton is an advertising agent resentful about her life. Months after her mother died, her boyfriend Jack broke up with her. Now a year later, her father Mike has a new wife, Sally. On Christmas Eve, Kate plans to win back Jack, though her best friend Miyoko is concerned she is denying reality. Kate visits a department store, passing a display of a partridge in a pear tree. She is accidentally sprayed in the face with perfume, then falls and loses consciousness. She awakes to see a store manager and a man named Jim checking on her. She goes to Nick's Bar, passing by a man named Toby, where she meets architect Miles Dufine, a blind date set up by Sally. Kate is rude and leaves the date to meet Jack, only to learn he has a new girlfriend Nancy. Kate joins Mike and Sally for a family Christmas dinner. Sally remarks Kate lost a chance at romance with Miles and can't change the past. At midnight, time rewinds.

Kate again wakes up in the department store, confused how she is experiencing the same day. Two children dressed as turtle doves run down the sidewalk. She tries harder to win over Jack, only to now learn he's planning to propose to Nancy. She meets Miles again but storms off when he mentions a wife. Sally explains he is a widower and his wife Laura died a year ago. At midnight, Kate witnesses time moving backwards, returning her to the department store.

On the third day, after seeing chefs carrying three cooked hens, Kate asks Jack about their relationship. Approaching Miles anonymously, she learns more about him. She spends the evening with her neighbor Margine Frumkin, learning how to bake.

On the fourth day, Kate finds Jack at a jewelry store where a display has four calling birds. She accepts their relationship is over. Kate meets Leigh, whose boyfriend Rich has an annual tradition of making a Christmas display for her. They spend the day together and Kate has a late night meeting with Miles. When she sees Toby again, who is consistently waiting for a blind date, Kate thinks he may be causing the time loop. She confronts him, ruining her date with Miles.

On the fifth day, Kate thanks Jim for always checking on her, then walks past a display case of Five Golden Rings perfume. Rather than wait for her blind date, she spends the day with Miles. At the family dinner, Kate realizes Sally and Mike do love each other. At mass, Kate admits her deep fear of being alone.

On the sixth day, Kate wakes up and is visibly overwhelmed. Sympathizing, Jim takes her to the botanical gardens where they pass by six children wearing goose hats. The two get to know each other and Kate decides she can do whatever she wants since reality will reboot. She misses her date in order to bake with Margine, Leigh, and Miyoko.

On the seventh day, Kate borrows lights from Rich, who is standing near seven plastic swans. This time, she asks Miles what he would like to do for their date. Miles invites her to the hockey rink where he regularly coaches the Lords, a team of children from a group home. One of the kids, Michael, ran away earlier in the day. Miles and Kate ice skate, then visit Prospect Park where she arranged a light display. The two are about to share a kiss when midnight strikes.

On the eighth day, Kate tells Jack she's moved past their relationship. Jack invites Kate for a cup of coffee at a cafe where a label shows eight maids milking. Jack reveals he had intended to propose to Kate in the past but she changed after her mother died, becoming obsessive and narrow-focused on what her life should be like. Kate realizes she was in love with marriage more than Jack. At Christmas dinner, Kate realizes Jack never bought an engagement ring and panics, ruining her date with Miles. She later learns Jack proposed without a ring.

On the ninth day, Kate is concerned she will never have a relationship with Miles. She goes to the bar early, where nine ladies are dancing, and drinks with Toby.

On the tenth day, Kate suggests Rich use his light display to propose to Leigh. She spots young Michael, who wears his Lords hockey sweatshirt (#10). She chases him but he leaps over a barrier and vanishes.

On the eleventh day, Kate finds Michael. She reunites him with Miles, then shares an anonymous date with the architect. A delivery truck advertises an 11-inch pizza from Pied Pipers of Pizza.

On the twelfth day, Kate walks by a display of 12 nutcrackers with drums. She helps Rich propose to Leigh, then plays matchmaker by introducing Margine to Jim and Toby to Miyoko. She invites all six to her family dinner. She briefly tells Jack she wishes him well in his new relationship, and convinces her sister's family to join the dinner. Meeting with Miles, the two quickly hit if off and then find Michael together, after which the kids from the group home also join the dinner. Impressed with Kate, Miles tells her he feels as if he's known her his whole life. The two finally share a kiss. Kate is overjoyed to see reality does not reboot at midnight.

Cast
 Amy Smart as Kate Stanton 
 Mark-Paul Gosselaar as Miles Dufine 
 Jayne Eastwood as Margine Frumkin
 Peter MacNeill as Mike Stanton
Mary Long as Sally
 Richard Fitzpatrick as Jim
 Benjamin Ayres as Jack Evans
 Jennifer Kydd as Nancy
 Martin Roach as Dr. Kirschner 
 Joe MacLeod as Toby
 Laura Miyata as Miyoko
 Stephan James as Michael
Cherisse Woonsam as Leigh
Paul Beer as Rich

Music and theme song
"Angels Are Singing" is a song performed by American recording artist Jordin Sparks, and serves as the theme song of 12 Dates of Christmas. It was released as a digital download on November 27, 2011 on iTunes and Amazon.com.

Critical reception
In Us Weekly, John Griffiths wrote, "This holiday romance steals a page from Groundhog Day and runs with it.... It's a sweet, wacky... and nicely woven journey, with the endearing Smart adding an extra twinkle."

On Common Sense Media, Emily Ashby said, "... 12 Dates of Christmas works in a sappy-sweet, opposites-attract love plot that just happens to take place on Christmas Eve. This holiday tie-in bolsters what's otherwise a lukewarm story marked by a handful of funny moments and the requisite romantic ones. There's little that's remarkable about the story itself, but that doesn't mean the mostly predictable ending won't leave you feeling warm and fuzzy nonetheless."

See also 
 List of films featuring time loops
 List of Christmas films

References

External links
 
 

2011 television films
2011 films
2010s Christmas films
2010s English-language films
ABC Family original films
American Christmas films
Christmas television films
Time loop films
Films directed by James Hayman